Hellenistic Judaism was a form of Judaism in classical antiquity that combined Jewish religious tradition with elements of Greek culture. Until the early Muslim conquests of the eastern Mediterranean, the main centers of Hellenistic Judaism were Alexandria in Egypt and Antioch in Syria (now in southern Turkey), the two main Greek urban settlements of the Middle East and North Africa region, both founded at the end of the fourth century BCE in the wake of the conquests of Alexander the Great. Hellenistic Judaism also existed in Jerusalem during the Second Temple Period, where there was conflict between Hellenizers and traditionalists.

The major literary product of the contact of Second Temple Judaism and Hellenistic culture is the Septuagint translation of the Hebrew Bible from Biblical Hebrew and Biblical Aramaic to Koine Greek, specifically, Jewish Koine Greek. Mentionable are also the philosophic and ethical treatises of Philo and the historiographical works of the other Hellenistic Jewish authors.

The decline of Hellenistic Judaism started in the second century and its causes are still not fully understood. It may be that it was eventually marginalized by, partially absorbed into, or progressively became the Koine-speaking core of Early Christianity centered on Antioch and its traditions, such as the Melkite Greek Catholic Church and the Greek Orthodox Church of Antioch.

Hellenism 

The conquests of Alexander in the late fourth century BCE spread Greek culture and colonization—a process of cultural change called Hellenization—over non-Greek lands, including the Levant. This gave rise to the Hellenistic period, which sought to create a common or universal culture in the Alexandrian empire based on that of fifth-century Athens, along with a fusion of Near Eastern cultures. The period is characterized by a new wave of Greek colonization which established Greek cities and kingdoms in Asia and Africa, the most famous being Alexandria in Egypt. New cities were established composed of colonists who came from different parts of the Greek world, and not from a specific metropolis ("mother city") as before.

These Jews living in countries west of the Levant formed the Hellenistic diaspora. The Egyptian diaspora is the most well-known of these. It witnessed close ties, indeed the firm economic integration, of Judea with the Ptolemaic Kingdom ruled from Alexandria, and the friendly relations which existed between the royal court and the leaders of the Jewish community. This was a diaspora of choice, not of imposition. Information is less robust regarding diasporas in other territories. It suggests that the situation was by and large the same as it was in Egypt.

Jewish life in both Judea and the diaspora was influenced by the culture and language of Hellenism. The Greeks viewed Jewish culture favorably, while Hellenism gained adherents among the Jews. While Hellenism has sometimes been presented (under the influence of 2 Maccabees, itself notably a work in Koine Greek) as a threat of assimilation diametrically opposed to Jewish tradition,

Later historians would sometimes depict Hellenism and Judaism uniquely incompatible, likely due to the influence of the persecution of Antiochus IV.  However, it does not appear that most Jews in the Hellenistic era considered Greek rulers any worse or different than Persian or Babylonian ones.  Writings of Hellenized Jews such as Philo of Alexandria show no particular belief that Judaism and Greek culture are incompatible; as another example, the Letter of Aristeas holds up Jews and Judaism in a favorable light by the standards of Greek culture.  The one major difference that even the most Hellenized Jews did not appear to compromise on was the prohibition on polytheism; this still separated Hellenistic Jews from wider Greek culture in refusing to honor shrines, temples, gods, and so on other than their own God of Israel.

Hellenistic rulers of Judea
Under the suzerainty of the Ptolemaic Kingdom and later the Seleucid Empire, Judea witnessed a period of peace and protection of its institutions. For their aid against his Ptolemaic enemies, Antiochus III the Great promised his Jewish subjects a reduction in taxes and funds to repair the city of Jerusalem and the Second Temple.

Relations deteriorated under Antiochus's successor Seleucus IV Philopator, and then, for reasons not fully understood, his successor Antiochus IV Epiphanes drastically overturned the previous policy of respect and protection, banning key Jewish religious rites and traditions in Judea (although not among the diaspora) and sparking a traditionalist revolt against Greek rule. Out of this revolt was formed an independent Jewish kingdom known as the Hasmonean kingdom, which lasted from 141 BCE to 63 BCE. The Hasmonean Dynasty eventually disintegrated due to a civil war.

Hasmonean civil war

The Hasmonean civil war began when the High Priest Hyrcanus II (a supporter of the Pharisees) was overthrown by his younger brother, Aristobulus II (a supporter of the Sadducees). A third faction, consisting primarily of Idumeans from Maresha, led by Antipater and his son Herod, re-installed Hyrcanus, who, according to Josephus, was merely Antipater's puppet. In 47 BCE, Antigonus, a nephew of Hyrcanus II and son of Aristobulus II, asked Julius Caesar for permission to overthrow Antipater. Caesar ignored him, and in 42 BCE Antigonus, with the aid of the Parthians, defeated Herod. Antigonus ruled for only three years, until Herod, with the aid of Rome, overthrew him and had him executed. Antigonus was the last Hasmonean ruler.

Influence 
The major literary product of the contact of Judaism and Hellenistic culture is the Septuagint, as well as the Book of Wisdom, Sirach, apocrypha and pseudepigraphic apocalyptic literature (such as the Assumption of Moses, the Testaments of the Twelve Patriarchs, the Book of Baruch, the Greek Apocalypse of Baruch, etc.) dating to the period. Important sources are Philo of Alexandria and Flavius Josephus. Some scholars consider Paul the Apostle to be a Hellenist as well, even though he himself claimed to be a Pharisee (Acts 23:6).

Philo of Alexandria was an important apologist of Judaism, presenting it as a tradition of venerable antiquity that, far from being a barbarian cult of an oriental nomadic tribe, with its doctrine of monotheism had anticipated tenets of Hellenistic philosophy. Philo could draw on Jewish tradition to use customs which Greeks thought as primitive or exotic as the basis for metaphors: such as "circumcision of the heart" in the pursuit of virtue. Consequently, Hellenistic Judaism emphasized monotheistic doctrine (heis theos), and represented reason (logos) and wisdom (sophia) as emanations from God.

Beyond Tarsus, Alexandretta, Antioch, and Northwestern Syria (the main "Cilician and Asiatic" centers of Hellenistic Judaism in the Levant), the second half of the Second Temple period witnessed an acceleration of Hellenization in Israel itself, with Jewish high priests and aristocrats alike adopting Greek names:

"There is neither Jew nor Greek" 
Ethnic, cultural, philosophical, and social tensions within the Hellenistic Jewish world were partly overcome by the emergence of a new, typically Antiochian, Middle-Eastern Greek doctrine (doxa), either by
 established, native Hellenized Cilician-Western Syrian Jews (themselves descendants of Babylonian Jewish migrants who had long adopted various elements of Greek culture and civilization while retaining a generally conservative, strict attachment to Halakha),
 heathen, 'Classical' Greeks, Macedonian Greeks and Greco-Syrian gentiles, or
 the local, native descendants of Greek or Greco-Syrian converts to mainstream Judaism – known as proselytes (Greek: προσήλυτος/proselytes) and Greek-speaking Jews born of mixed marriages.

Their efforts were probably facilitated by the arrival of a fourth wave of Greek-speaking newcomers to Cilicia and Northwestern Syria: Cypriot Jews and 'Cyrenian' (Libyan) Jewish migrants of non-Egyptian North African Jewish origin, as well as gentile Roman settlers from Italy—many of whom already spoke fluent Koine Greek and/or sent their children to Greek schools. Some scholars believe that, at the time, these Cypriot and Cyrenian North African Jewish migrants, such as Simon of Cyrene, were generally less affluent than the native Cilician-Syrian Jews and practiced a more 'liberal' form of Judaism, more propitious for the formation of a new canon:

Decline of the Hellenistai and partial conversion to Christianity 

The reasons for the decline of Hellenistic Judaism are obscure. It may be that it was marginalized by, absorbed into, or became Early Christianity (see the Gospel of the Hebrews). The Pauline epistles and the Acts of the Apostles report that, after his initial focus on the conversion of Hellenized Jews across Anatolia, Macedonia, Thrace and Northern Syria without criticizing their laws and traditions, Paul the Apostle eventually preferred to evangelize communities of Greek and Macedonian proselytes and Godfearers, or Greek circles sympathetic to Judaism: the Apostolic Decree allowing converts to forego circumcision made Christianity a more attractive option for interested pagans than Rabbinic Judaism, which required ritual circumcision for converts (see Brit milah). See also Circumcision controversy in early Christianity and the Abrogation of Old Covenant laws.

The attractiveness of Christianity may, however, have suffered a setback with its being explicitly outlawed in the 80s CE by Domitian as a "Jewish superstition", while Judaism retained its privileges as long as members paid the fiscus Judaicus. 

The opening verse of Acts 6 points to the problematic cultural divisions between Hellenized Jews and Aramaic-speaking Israelites in Jerusalem, a disunion that reverberated within the emerging Christian community itself: 

Some historians believe that a sizeable proportion of the Hellenized Jewish communities of Southern Turkey (Antioch, Alexandretta and neighboring cities) and Syria/Lebanon converted progressively to the Greco-Roman branch of Christianity that eventually constituted the "Melkite" (or "Imperial") Hellenistic churches of the MENA area:

Cultural legacy

Widespread influence beyond Second Temple Judaism 
Both Early Christianity and Early Rabbinical Judaism were far less 'orthodox' and less theologically homogeneous than they are today; and both were significantly influenced by Hellenistic religion and borrowed allegories and concepts from Classical Hellenistic philosophy and the works of Greek-speaking Jewish authors of the end of the Second Temple period before the two schools of thought eventually affirmed their respective 'norms' and doctrines, notably by diverging increasingly on key issues such as the status of 'purity laws', the validity of Judeo-Christian messianic beliefs, and, more importantly, the use of Koiné Greek and Latin as liturgical languages replacing Biblical Hebrew, etc.

First synagogues in Europe, North Africa, and the Middle East 
The word synagogue itself comes from Jewish Koiné Greek, a language spoken by Hellenized Jews across Southeastern Europe (Macedonia, Thrace, Northern Greece), North Africa and the Middle East after the 3rd century BCE. Many synagogues were built by the Hellenistai or adherents of Hellenistic Judaism in the Greek Isles, Cilicia, Northwestern and Eastern Syria and Northern Israel as early as the first century BCE- notably in Delos, Antioch, Alexandretta, Galilee and Dura-Europos: because of the mosaics and frescos representing heroic figures and Biblical characters (viewed as potentially conductive of "image worship" by later generations of Jewish scholars and rabbis), many of these early synagogues were at first mistaken for Greek temples or Antiochian Greek Orthodox churches.

Mishnaic and Talmudic concepts 
Many of the Jewish sages who compiled the Mishnah and earliest versions of the Talmud were Hellenized Jews, including Johanan ben Zakai, the first Jewish sage attributed the title of rabbi and Rabbi Meir, the son of proselyte Anatolian Greek converts to Early Rabbinical Judaism.

Even Israeli rabbis of Babylonian Jewish descent such as Hillel the Elder whose parents were Aramaic-speaking Jewish migrants from Babylonia (hence the nickname "Ha-Bavli"), had to learn Greek language and Greek philosophy in order to be conversant with sophisticated rabbinical language – many of the theological innovations introduced by Hillel had Greek names, most famously the Talmudic notion of Prozbul, from Koine Greek προσβολή, "to deliver":

Influence on Levantine Byzantine traditions 
The unique combination of ethnocultural traits inhered from the fusion of a Greek-Macedonian cultural base, Hellenistic Judaism and Roman civilization gave birth to the distinctly Antiochian “Middle Eastern-Roman” Christian traditions of Cilicia (Southeastern Turkey) and Syria/Lebanon:

Some typically Grecian "Ancient Synagogal" priestly rites and hymns have survived partially to the present, notably in the distinct church services of the followers of the Melkite Greek Catholic church and its sister-church the Greek Orthodox Church of Antioch in the Hatay Province of Southern Turkey, Syria, Lebanon, Northern Israel, and in the Greek-Levantine Christian diasporas of Brazil, Mexico, the United States and Canada.

But many of the surviving liturgical traditions of these communities rooted in Hellenistic Judaism and, more generally, Second Temple Greco-Jewish Septuagint culture, were expunged progressively in the late medieval and modern eras by both Phanariot European-Greek (Ecumenical Patriarch of Constantinople) and Vatican (Roman Catholic) gentile theologians who sought to 'bring back' Levantine Greek Orthodox and Greek-Catholic communities into the European Christian fold: some ancient Judeo-Greek traditions were thus deliberately abolished or reduced in the process.

Members of these communities still call themselves "Rûm" (literally "Roman"; usually referred to as "Byzantine" in English) and referring to Greeks in Turkish, Persian and Levantine Arabic. In that context, the term Rûm is preferred over Yāvāni or Ionani (literally "Ionian"), also referring to Greeks in Ancient Hebrew, Sanskrit and Classical Arabic.

Individual Hellenized Jews

Hellenistic and Hasmonean Period 
 Andronicus son of Meshullam, Egyptian Jewish scholar of the 2nd century BCE. One of the first known advocates of early Pharisaic (proto-Rabbinical) orthodoxy against the Samaritans.
 Antigonus of Sokho, also known as Antigonos of Socho, was the first scholar of whom Pharisaic tradition has preserved not only the name but also an important theological doctrine. He flourished about the first half of the third century BCE. According to the Mishnah, he was the disciple and successor of Simon the Just. Antigonus is also the first noted Jew to have a Greek name, a fact commonly discussed by scholars regarding the extent of Hellenic influence on Judaism following the conquest of Judaea by Alexander the Great.
 Antigonus II Mattathias (known in Hebrew as Matityahu) was the last Hasmonean king of Judea. Antigonus was executed in 37 BCE, after a reign of three years during which he led the national struggle of the Jews for independence from the Romans.
 Alexander of Judaea, or Alexander Maccabeus, was the eldest son of Aristobulus II, king of Judaea
 Aristobulus of Alexandria, philosopher of the Peripatetic school who attempted to fuse ideas in the Hebrew Scriptures with those in Greek thought
 Jason of the Oniad family, High Priest in the Temple in Jerusalem from 175 to 172 BCE
 Menelaus, High Priest in Jerusalem from 171 BCE to about 161 BCE
 Mariamne I, Jewish princess of  the Hasmonean dynasty, was the second wife of Herod the Great.
 Onias I (Hellenized form of Hebrew name from (Hebrew: Honiyya) was the son of Jaddua mentioned in Nehemiah. According to Josephus, this Jaddua is said to have been a contemporary of Alexander the Great. I Maccabees regards Onias as a contemporary of the Spartan king Areus I (309-265 BCE). Onias I is thought to be the father or grandfather of Simon the Just.  
 Ben Sira, also known as Yesu'a son of Sirach, leading 2nd century BCE Jewish scholar and theologian who lived in Jerusalem and Alexandria, author of the Wisdom of Sirach, or "Book of Ecclesiasticus".
 Simeon the Just or Simeon the Righteous ( Shimon HaTzaddik) was a Jewish High Priest during the time of the Second Temple.
 Simon Thassi (died 135 BCE) was the second son of king Mattathias and the first prince of the Jewish Hasmonean Dynasty. He was also a general (Doric Greek: στραταγός, stratagos; literally meaning "army leader") in the Greco-Syrian Seleucid army of Antiochus VI

Herodian and Roman Period 
 Andrew the Apostle (from the early 1st century – mid to late 1st century CE), Galilean Jew who was one of the Twelve Apostles, called in the Greek Orthodox tradition , or the 'First-called', believed to have preached in Southeastern Europe (Northern Greece) as well as possibly in Southern Russia (Scythia). Patron saint of Ukraine and Scotland
 Titus Flavius Josephus, was the first Jewish historian. Initially a Jewish military leader during the First Jewish-Roman War, he famously switched sides and became a Roman citizen and acclaimed Romano-Jewish academic. He popularized the idea that Judaism was similar in many ways to Greek philosophy 
 Justus of Tiberias, Jewish historian born in Tiberias, "a highly Hellenistic Galilean city", he was a secretary to governor Herod Agrippa II and rival of Titus Flavius Josephus
 Julianos (Hellenized form of the Latin name Julianus) and Pappos (from Koine Greek  or  'patriarch' or 'elder') born circa 80 CE in the city of Lod (Greco-Latin: Lydda, Diospolis,  /  – city of Zeus), one of the main centers of Hellenistic culture in central Israel. Julianos and Pappos led the Jewish resistance movement against the Roman army in Israel during the Kitos War, 115-117 CE (their Hebrew names were Shamayah and Ahiyah respectively)
 Lukuas, also called Andreas, Libyan Jew born circa 70 CE, was one of the main leaders the Jewish resistance movement against the Roman army in North Africa and Egypt during the Kitos War, 115-117 CE
 Rabbi Meir, a famous Jewish sage who lived in Galilee in the time of the Mishna, is thought to be the son of Anatolian Greek (Talmud, Tractate Kilayim) gentile proselyte converts to Pharisaic Judaism (folk etymologies and mistranslations connected him, wrongly, to the family of Emperor Nero). He was the son-in-law of Haninah ben Teradion, himself a Hellenized Jewish aristocrat and leading rabbinical figure in late 1st century CE Jewish theology 
 Philo of Alexandria (Philōn; c. 20 BCE – c. 50 CE), also called Philo Judaeus, of Alexandria, in the Roman province of Egypt, first Jewish philosopher
 Saul of Tarsus or Sha'ul HaTarsi, known as Paul the Apostle, Jewish Pharisee from Cilicia who converted to Christianity and became one of the most important figures of the Apostolic Age, spread Christianity in much of Anatolia, Southeastern Europe (Greece, Thrace, and Illyria) and Rome; wrote nearly half of the New Testament.
 Simon of Cyrene (Standard Hebrew , Tiberian Hebrew ), Libyan Jew born at the end of the 1st century BCE; lived in Jerusalem around 30 CE. Believed to have been "forced [by Roman soldiers] to bear the cross of Jesus after the crucifixtion". His home town, Cyrene, in Northeastern Libya, was a Greek colony, with a large Jewish community where 100,000 Judean Jews had been deported and forced to settle during the reign of Ptolemy Soter (323–285 BCE), the Greco-Macedonian ruler of Egypt, following his invasion of Israel.
 Rabbi Tarfon (from the Greek name  ), a kohen, was a member of the third generation of the Mishnah sages, who lived in the period between the destruction of the Second Temple (70 CE) and the fall of Betar (135 CE).  Thought to be originally from the region of Lod (Greco-Latin: Lydda, Diospolis,  /  – city of Zeus), one of the main centers of Hellenistic culture in central Israel, R. Tarfon was one of the most vociferous Jewish critics of Early Christianity
 Rabbi Haninah ben Teradion, prominent Galilean Jewish scholar and teacher. His father's name (Teradion) is thought to be of Judeo-Greek origin. Also, 'Hananiah' (or 'Haninah') was a popular name amongst the Hellenized Jews of Syria and Northern Israel (pronounced 'Ananias' in Greek). He was a leading figure in late 1st century CE Jewish theology and one of the Ten Martyrs murdered by the Romans for ignoring the ban on teaching Torah
 Timothy the Apostle born in Lycaonia (Southeastern Turkey) of Greek father and Hellenized Jewish mother, seconded Paul in his missions to Asia Minor and Southeastern Europe (Thrace, Macedonia, Greece).
 Trypho the Jew, thought to be a 2nd-century CE rabbi opposed to Christian apologist Justin Martyr, whose Dialogue with Trypho is paradoxically "equally influenced by Greek and Rabbinic thought." He is most likely the same as Rabbi Tarfon.

Late Antiquity and Early Medieval Era 
 Rav Pappa (from Koine Greek  or  'patriarch' or 'elder' – originally 'father') (ca. 300 – died 375) was a Jewish Talmudist who lived in Babylonia, at a time when Judeo-Aramaic culture was regaining the upper hand against classical Hellenistic Judaism, notably amongst Jewish communities in Babylonia which reverted progressively to the pre-Hellenistic Aramaic culture
 Kalonymos family ( in Greek), first known rabbinical dynasty of Northern Italy and Central Europe: notable members include Ithiel I, author of Jewish prayer books (born circa 780 CE) and Kalonymus Ben Meshullam born in France circa 1000, spiritual leader of the Jewish community of Mainz in Western Germany
 The Radhanites: an influential group of Jewish merchants and financiers active in France, Germany, Central Europe, Central Asia and China in the Early Middle Ages – thought to have revolutionized the world economy and contributed to the creation of the 'Medieval Silk Road' long before Italian and Byzantine merchants.

See also

References

Further reading

Foreign language

English
 Borgen, Peder. Early Christianity and Hellenistic Judaism. Edinburgh, Scotland: T&T Clark, 1996.
 Cohen, Getzel M. The Hellenistic Settlements in Syria, the Red Sea Basin, and North Africa. Hellenistic Culture and Society 46. Berkeley: University of California Press, 2005.
 Gruen, Erich S. Constructs of Identity In Hellenistic Judaism: Essays On Early Jewish Literature and History. Boston: De Gruyter, 2016.
 Mirguet, Françoise. An Early History of Compassion: Emotion and Imagination In Hellenistic Judaism. New York: Cambridge University Press, 2017.
 Neusner, Jacob, and William Scott Green, eds. Dictionary of Judaism in the Biblical Period: 450 BCE to 600 CE. 2 vols. New York: Macmillan Library Reference, 1996.
 
 The Jewish Encyclopedia

External links
 Books that contain Bibliographies on the Hellenistic Judaism - Oxford Bibliographies

 
Ancient Jewish Greek history